Australian children's musical group Hi-5 performed on eighteen concert tours. In 1999, International Concert Attractions (ICA) Australia were signed as the tour promoters for Hi-5 for their tour of Australia. The Jump and Jive with Hi-5 tour was performed from September to December 1999, beginning in Tasmania and continuing to venues such as the Sydney Opera House and Newcastle Civic Theatre in New South Wales. In 2000, the group performed over 180 shows in a national tour of Australia, also travelling to New Zealand and Singapore. The concert contained songs from the first two albums, Jump and Jive with Hi-5 and It's a Party. In the first four weeks of ticket sales, over 50,000 units were sold. The group performed at the State Theatre in Sydney in October. In 2001, Hi-5 performed to audiences in Australia and New Zealand. The Hi-5 Alive tour ran for three months and toured Adelaide, Perth, Melbourne, Canberra, Sydney and Newcastle.

The group debuted their Space Magic tour in the United Kingdom in March 2005, several months before the show was first performed in Australia. The tour was performed in arenas around Australia in November and December 2005, to maximise the audience capacity. The concert was reported to run from 75 to 90 minutes and was the group's "biggest tour ever".

Concert tours

Cancelled performances

Televised appearances

Other appearances

References
Notes

Citations

Hi-5